The 2003 season was the New England Patriots' 34th in the National Football League (NFL), their 44th overall and their fourth under head coach Bill Belichick. They finished with a league-best 14–2 record before advancing to and winning Super Bowl XXXVIII.

Two seasons after winning Super Bowl XXXVI, the Patriots went into 2003 after missing the playoffs in 2002. In a salary cap-related move, captain and Pro Bowl safety Lawyer Milloy was released five days before the start of the regular season, prompting second-guessing of head coach Bill Belichick among some fans and a report by ESPN analyst Tom Jackson that Patriots players "hated their coach", an accusation later denied by players. Milloy signed with the Buffalo Bills, who defeated the Patriots, 31–0, in the season opener. The Patriots would rebound though, not losing another game after starting with a 2–2 record. Due to multiple injuries, the Patriots started 42 different players during the season, an NFL record for a division winner until the Patriots started 45 different players in 2005. Undefeated at home, nose tackle Ted Washington (who joined the team in the offseason) coined the phrase "Homeland Defense" for a Patriots' defense, boosted by the acquisitions of Washington and San Diego Chargers castoff safety Rodney Harrison in the offseason, that gave up a league-low 14.9 points per game en route to a 14–2 regular season record. The regular season was bookended with a 31–0 victory over the Bills at home in Week 17, a score reversed from the Patriots' shutout loss to the Bills in Week 1. The win gave the Patriots a perfect 8–0 record at home in the regular season and the 14–2 season was a club record and the first time the Patriots ever won more than 11 games in a season.

After a first-round bye in the AFC playoffs, the Patriots faced the Tennessee Titans at home in one of the coldest games in NFL history and won, setting up an AFC Championship Game matchup with the Indianapolis Colts. The top-seeded Patriots intercepted Colts quarterback Peyton Manning, the league's co-MVP, four times, winning 24–14 and advancing to Super Bowl XXXVIII against the Carolina Panthers. With a tied game late in the fourth quarter, Adam Vinatieri kicked the game-winning field goal with seconds remaining, giving the Patriots their second Super Bowl victory in three seasons.

Offseason roster changes
The Patriots signed safety Rodney Harrison, linebacker Rosevelt Colvin, fullback Fred McCrary, cornerback Tyrone Poole, linebacker Don Davis, tight end Fred Baxter, safety Chris Akins, fullback Larry Centers and wide receiver Dedric Ward in free agency.

The Patriots traded safety Tebucky Jones to the New Orleans Saints for three draft picks; a 2003 3rd round pick, a 2003 7th round pick, and a 2004 4th round pick. 

Before the season began, the Patriots acquired defensive tackle Ted Washington in a trade with the Chicago Bears and released safety Lawyer Milloy after he refused to take a pay cut. Milloy would later sign with the Buffalo Bills.

Draft

Staff

Roster

Opening training camp roster 
At the time of the first public training camp practice at Gillette Stadium on July 24, they had the NFL maximum of 80 players signed to their roster. The Patriots received seven roster exemptions for the NFL Europe allocations of Dyshod Carter, Mike Malan, Mike Clare, Rod Trafford, Courtney Ledyard, Brad Harris, and Scott McCready. Additionally, the Patriots allocated offensive lineman Corey Mitchell, wide receiver T. C. Taylor, and quarterback Shane Stafford to NFL Europe and received roster exemptions for them, but those players were waived before the start of training camp. Finally, injured exclusive rights free agent Stephen Neal did not sign his tender until after camp began, and did not count against the roster limit.

Week 1 roster

Final roster

Preseason

Regular season

Schedule

Game summaries

Week 1: at Buffalo Bills

Following the release of Lawyer Milloy, the Patriots met the Bills in Buffalo, and Milloy was there after signing a deal with the Bills. Drew Bledsoe threw for one touchdown while Tom Brady was picked off four times; in the second quarter defensive lineman Sam Adams (whose namesake father played for the Patriots alongside John Hannah) ran an interception back for a 37-yard touchdown; a still from Adams' run was used for the cover of Sports Illustrated. Brady was also sacked twice, once by Milloy, in a 31–0 Bills rout. This would be the last time the Patriots would post a sub-500 record until 145 games later, when they were 1–2 after their first three games of the 2012 season.  It was also their most recent regular season opening loss until 2014 as the team started 0–1. This was also their last shutout loss until week 14 of the 2006 season. It is Brady's worst loss by margin of defeat as a Patriot.

Week 2: at Philadelphia Eagles

Behind 30 completions in 44 attempts for 247 yards and three touchdowns (two to Christian Fauria and one to Deion Branch), Tom Brady led the Patriots to their first win of the season by beating the Eagles. Donovan McNabb was hammered by the Patriots defense, limited to just 18 completions in 46 throws; he was picked off twice (Tedy Bruschi ran back an interception for an 18-yard touchdown) and sacked eight times. The Patriots came into the late-afternoon game after hearing ESPN's NFL pregame show where analyst Tom Jackson stated outright "They hate their coach", even though no effort at verification on the part of Jackson had ever been made. Bill Belichick was incensed by the comment and refused to speak to anyone connected with ESPN outside of Chris Berman (a friend of Belichick's) for years after.

Week 3: vs. New York Jets

The Patriots home opener came against an injury-shot Jets squad. Chad Pennington had been injured in preseason and former Jets starter Vinny Testaverde had to take over; it was the future Patriot's first game against New England since a 44–7 slaughter by the Pats in September 2002. The Jets running game had been shut down in that 2002 matchup and it didn't do much better this time around, totalling just 65 yards, 53 of them from former Patriot Curtis Martin. Kevin Faulk and Antowain Smith rushed for 134 yards and Tom Brady threw for 181 yards, but until the final five minutes of the third quarter it was a battle of field goals –  tied at 9 until Brady ran in a one-yard score. At the start of the fourth rookie Asante Samuel picked off Testaverde and ran back a 55-yard touchdown. Vinny did connect with Wayne Chrebet two minutes later, but the remaining thirteen minutes went scoreless as the Patriots took the win 23–16.

Week 4: at Washington Redskins

Steve Spurrier became the last NFL coach to defeat the Patriots until Halloween 2004 as the Redskins raced to a 20–3 lead in the third quarter. Adam Vinatieri missed a field goal try for the first time in the year and Tom Brady was picked off in Washington's red zone twice, once by Champ Bailey. Ladell Betts and Rock Cartwright ran in touchdowns as the Redskins ground game (led by Trung Canidate's 70 yards) ate up 119 yards. It was enough to hold off two late Brady touchdowns in a 20–17 Patriots loss.

Week 5: vs. Tennessee Titans

The Patriots began a 21-game winning streak in hosting the Titans, who had beaten the Patriots the previous December. Nursing the shoulder injury incurred in the 2002 game against the Titans that had flamed up again, Brady threw for a comparatively modest 219 yards and a 58-yard score to Troy Brown. The game lead changed seven times as Steve McNair threw for 360 yards and rushed in two touchdowns while Patriots running backs Antowain Smith and Mike Cloud rushed for 153 yards and three scores and rookie Bethel Johnson ran back a fourth-quarter kick 71 yards, setting up Cloud's second touchdown. The decisive score came when McNair was picked off by a hobbling Ty Law for a 65-yard touchdown – McNair threw to Tyrone Calico (who'd had a 60-yard touchdown called back when he was ruled out of bounds inside the 5-yard line), but Calico slipped to the ground just as Law jumped into his route – and a 38–30 Patriots triumph. Fan cheering for the Red Sox-Oakland A's playoff Game Four concurrent with Tennessee Titans scoring drives caused a stir on the sidelines and also in the CBS and Patriots radio broadcast booths.

Week 6: vs. New York Giants

In a rainstorm that postponed Game Four of the 2003 ALCS later that night, the Patriots hosted the New York Giants. The first throw by Kerry Collins was batted in the air and intercepted, leading to a Patriots field goal attempt that missed. Later, Tiki Barber was hit and fumbled to Matt Chatham, who ran in a 30-yard touchdown. Collins was picked off four times as the Patriots grounded out a 17–6 win.

Week 7: at Miami Dolphins

Battling the Dolphins for the division lead, the Patriots erased a 13–6 gap with a Brady touchdown pass to David Givens in the third. The Dolphins marched down field late in the fourth; during this drive a Ricky Williams first down run was protested by the Patriots who felt Williams' knee touched the dirt infield at Pro Player Stadium, but the challenge was denied. The Dolphins attempted a 35-yard field goal at the two-minute warning, but the kick was blocked by Richard Seymour. The Dolphins smothered the Patriots' final drive attempt (the decisive play came when former Patriot Terrell Buckley stopped Kevin Faulk for a four-yard loss) and the game went to overtime. Controversy ensued on the coin flip for overtime; referee Gerald Austin used a silver dollar; the coin came up Lady Columbia (which is "heads" on a silver dollar) but Patriot captains Brady and Seymour protested that it came up "tails." The Dolphins drove downfield but missed another 35-yard field goal try, in part because Olindo Mare couldn't plant his foot on the infield dirt, which was still in place because of the Florida Marlins' run towards their 2003 World Series victory; after forcing a Patriots punt Jay Fiedler was hit by Tedy Bruschi and lobbed a 60-yard pass picked off at the Patriots 18-yard line by Tyrone Poole. Brady then ended the game with a spectacular 82-yard touchdown strike to Troy Brown and a 19–13 final.

Week 8: vs. Cleveland Browns

Despite 367 yards of offense the Patriots could only muster three Adam Vinatieri field goals, with his fifth miss of the season added in.  The Patriots defense limited the Browns to 203 yards of offense while Ty Law picked off Kelly Holcomb, this was Law's second interception of the season. Holcomb was also sacked three times as the Browns limped home after a 9–3 Patriots win.  During the game an apparent Browns fumble was overturned based on the rule immortalized in New England’s 2001 game vs the Raiders.

Week 9: at Denver Broncos

The Patriots made their only appearance on Monday Night Football of the season in this matchup against the Broncos, who had beaten the Patriots in 13 of the two teams' 15 previous meetings. The Broncos held a 24–23 lead in the fourth with backup quarterback Danny Kanell starting and despite injuries to receiver Ed McCaffrey and kicker Jason Elam. Backed up to their one-yard line, the Patriots were forced to punt, but with so little room to work, they snapped the ball through the endzone for a deliberate safety. On the ensuing free kick, the Patriots pinned the Broncos near their own goal line and forced a Denver punt. In the final two minutes, the Patriots drove downfield and Tom Brady fired an 18-yard touchdown strike to David Givens. Kanell threw a long pass that was intercepted by rookie Asante Samuel with seven seconds left, securing a 30–26 Patriots win.

Week 11: vs. Dallas Cowboys

For only the second time in their history the Patriots defeated the Cowboys.  Both teams entered the Sunday Night Football contest at 7–2 and the game was the first showdown between Bill Belichick and the coach he worked under for many years, former Patriots coach Bill Parcells. The Cowboys gained only 291 yards of offense while the Patriots did worse, limited to 268 yards; three Quincy Carter interceptions (two by Ty Law) proved decisive. The Patriots managed two Adam Vinatieri field goals and a two-yard Antowain Smith touchdown marred by a blocked PAT. With a 12–0 win, the Patriots continued their winning streak from the end of September.

Week 12: at Houston Texans

Facing their future defensive coach Dom Capers, the Patriots made their first trip to Houston since 1988 and a 31–6 loss to the Oilers at the Astrodome. The Patriots led 10–3 at the half, but Adam Vinatieri missed a 38-yard field goal try at the end of the half, his first miss inside a dome in his career. Tony Banks erupted to three second-half touchdowns as the Texans' defense bullied the Patriots into a fumble (recovered by Jay Foreman) and a Tom Brady INT. Trailing 20–13 in the final minutes of regulation the Patriots drove down field; at the Texan' 4-yard line Brady was chased out of the pocket and threw a pass caught in the endzone in mid-air by Daniel Graham. In overtime a 37-yard Vinatieri field goal try was blocked by Ramon Walker, but the Texans were forced to punt. Late in overtime the Texans' Marlon McCree picked off Brady at his 5-yard line but a holding penalty nullified the turnover, and Vinatieri kicked the game-winner with 41 seconds left in overtime and a 23–20 Patriots win. The game marked the last time New England would trail in any 2003 contest until Super Bowl XXXVIII - which took place in Houston as well.

Week 13: at Indianapolis Colts

Though Tom Brady had faced Peyton Manning twice coming in, this game marked the true beginning of the most celebrated quarterback rivalry in NFL history. The game was the Patriots' first meeting with the Colts since 2002 divisional realignment put the Colts into the new AFC South after 32 seasons with the Pats in the AFC East. The two teams stood at 9–2, the latest in a season two teams with nine wins had met. The Patriots raced to a 17–3 second-quarter lead behind scores by Mike Cloud and Dedric Ward. Following a Peyton Manning touchdown to Marcus Pollard with 12 seconds left in the first half, Bethel Johnson ran back the ensuing kick 92 yards for a touchdown. But the Patriots 31–10 runaway following another Cloud touchdown became an epic shootout as two Brady interceptions gave the Colts touchdown drives, and they tied the game at 31 at 4:39 of the fourth. Another monster Johnson kick return set up a Brady to Deion Branch touchdown, but after a Kevin Faulk fumble and ensuing Mike Vanderjagt field goal the score stood at 38–34 Patriots. A short Ken Walter punt led to a Colts drive to the Patriots goalline in the final minute. A heroic goalline stand led by Willie McGinest and Ted Washington stopped the Colts from scoring and the win left several Patriots visibly shaken; Rodney Harrison noted afterward, "I've never seen anything like this." The two teams combined for 582 yards of offense.

Week 14: vs. Miami Dolphins

The Dolphins traveled to Foxboro to face the Patriots in the tail end of a snowstorm that dumped well over a foot of snow on the area. The only scoring of the first three quarters came late in the first quarter, when Adam Vinatieri hit a 29-yard field goal to put the Patriots ahead. With both offenses struggling, the Patriots missed a chance to open a wider lead when Vinatieri missed a 54-yard field goal at the end of the first half. The Dolphins threatened the Patriots offensively for the first time in the game late in the third quarter, advancing to the Patriots' 10-yard line before Rodney Harrison strip-sacked Jay Fiedler, with Mike Vrabel recovering the fumble for the Patriots (and embarrassing Dolphins rookie TE Randy McMichael, who had talked trash about the Patriots before the game but blew his blocking assignment against Harrison on this play). In the fourth quarter, punter Brooks Barnard (replacing Ken Walter, who'd been cut a week after poor punts against the Colts), would pin the Dolphins at their own 4-yard line. Fiedler's first pass was intercepted by Tedy Bruschi and returned five yards for a touchdown. The play became notable more for the fans' celebration afterwards, as they would throw the fallen snow in the air in a form of "snow fireworks." At the two-minute warning, Brady would pooch-punt and pin the Dolphins at their own 1-yard line; Fiedler was sacked a few plays later for a safety that sealed a 12–0 Patriots victory and the division title.

Week 15: vs. Jacksonville Jaguars

In a mild snowstorm the Patriots faced the Jaguars for the first time since Jacksonville's 1998 playoff win over New England. The Patriots defense saw something they hadn't seen since they faced the Tennessee Titans in Week Five – the opponent scored a touchdown in Foxboro, as late in the fourth quarter Kevin Johnson caught a 27-yard touchdown pass from future Tom Brady offensive coach Byron Leftwich, the first home touchdown allowed since Steve McNair ran in a score in the fourth quarter in Week Five – nearly five whole games.  It didn't matter as two Tom Brady touchdown throws, an Antowain Smith rushing score, and two Vinatieri field goals were enough for a 27–13 Patriots win.

Week 16: at New York Jets

In bitter cold the 12–2 Patriots faced a grinder against the 6–8 Jets, who were coming off a 6–0 shutout of Pittsburgh the week before; the Patriots were also facing Chad Pennington for the first time since a 30–17 Jets win in 2002. The Patriots picked off Pennington right away, setting up David Givens' 35-yard score not even one minute into the game.  Pennington tied the game on a one-yard run late in the first quarter, but early in the second he was picked off by Willie McGinest at his own 15 and McGinest scored.  Givens caught another touchdown pass in the third, but the score was only 21–16 after a second Pennington rushing score and a missed two-point try. Pennington was then picked off for the fifth time late in the fourth, finishing an ugly 21–16 Patriots win. The win moved New England to 13-2 before a rematch against the Bills in the season finale.

Week 17: vs. Buffalo Bills

The regular season finale saw the Patriots hosting the same Bills that blanked them 31–0 in September. Revenge drove the Patriots as Tom Brady threw four touchdowns, all in the first half, and despite an ugly hit in the legs by Lawyer Milloy in the second quarter. Adam Vinatieri missed a third-quarter field goal but connected from 24 yards out in the fourth. Drew Bledsoe never got on track and was pulled in the fourth quarter for Travis Brown, who got to the Patriots redzone at the end of the fourth quarter but was intercepted in the endzone by Larry Izzo. The Patriots' 31–0 win bookended the season.

Standings

Division

Standings breakdown

Postseason

Schedule

Game summaries

Divisional Round vs. Tennessee Titans

In one of the coldest games in NFL history, with temperatures reaching , the Patriots survived both the cold and NFL co-MVP Steve McNair, relying on yet another game-winning field goal from kicker Adam Vinatieri late in the fourth quarter and a key defensive stand.

Tom Brady stormed out the gates with a 19-yard completion to Kevin Faulk with his first pass attempt. A few plays later, the Titans defensive scheme confused him and caused him to burn a timeout, but it was well spent. On the next play, he threw a 41-yard touchdown pass to Bethel Johnson. McNair struck back with a 15-yard completion to Derrick Mason and a 24-yard pass to running back Eddie George, moving the ball to the Patriots 22-yard line. Roman Phifer almost ended the drive by intercepting a pass from McNair, but lineman Richard Seymour was penalized for roughing the passer and the Titans got the ball back with a first down on the New England 9-yard line. Two plays later, Chris Brown scored a 5-yard touchdown run to tie the game.

After the ensuing kickoff, Brady completed two passes to Dedric Ward for 30 yards on a 38-yard drive to the Titans 26-yard line. The drive ended with no points when Vinatieri missed a 44-yard field goal attempt, but on the next play, safety Rodney Harrison intercepted a pass from McNair and returned it 7 yards to the Patriots 43-yard line. Brady subsequently completed four of six passes for 49 yards and rushed for 3 on the way to a 1-yard touchdown run by Antowain Smith to retake the lead less than two minutes into the second quarter. Later in the period, the Titans drove 51 yards in nine plays to the Patriots 13-yard line, featuring a 29-yard completion from McNair to Mason. But New England's defense kept them out the end zone and blocked Gary Anderson's 31-yard field goal attempt.

Early in the third quarter, McNair led the Titans on a 70-yard scoring drive, completing 5 consecutive passes for 59 yards and capping it off with an 11-yard touchdown pass to Mason. The rest of the third quarter was scoreless, but midway through the fourth quarter, Troy Brown's 10-yard punt return gave the Patriots great field position at the Titans 40-yard line. The Patriots gained only 13 yards on their ensuing possession, but it was enough for Vinatieri to make a 46-yard field goal, giving New England a 17–14 lead with 4:02 left in regulation.

The Titans took the ensuing kickoff and drove to the Patriots 33-yard line. But two penalties, a 10-yard intentional grounding call and a holding penalty, pushed them back 20 yards. McNair threw an 11-yard completion on the next play, but after that, Drew Bennett dropped a potential first down catch on fourth down and 12, and the Titans turned the ball over on downs with 1:38 left.

The win was the 325th in Patriots history.

AFC Championship vs. Indianapolis Colts

New England's defense dominated the Colts, only allowing 14 points, intercepting 4 passes from Peyton Manning (3 of them by Ty Law), recording 4 sacks (three by Jarvis Green), and forcing a safety. Although New England's offense fared no better and only scored one touchdown, Vinatieri's 5 field goals made up for the difference as the Patriots won, 24–14, to advance to their second Super Bowl appearance in 3 seasons.

The Patriots took the opening kickoff and scored on their first drive, advancing the ball 65 yards in 13 plays. Tom Brady completed four passes to receiver David Givens for 40 yards on the drive, including a 7-yard touchdown pass, and converted a fourth down on his own 44-yard line with a 2-yard run. Manning seemed ready to counter, driving the Colts 68 yards to the Patriot 5-yard line, but on third down and 3, his pass was intercepted by Rodney Harrison in the end zone. After the interception, the Patriots drove 67 yards to the Colts 13-yard line where Vinatieri's 31-yard field goal increased their lead to 10–0.

The Patriots defense continued to dominate the Colts in the second quarter. On the first play after the ensuing kickoff, Law intercepted a pass from Manning and returned it 6 yards to the 41-yard line. The Patriots then drove 52 yards and increased their lead to 13–0 with a second Vinatieri field goal. Brady completed three passes for 42 yards on the drive, including a 17-yarder to Givens and a 16-yard completion to Troy Brown on fourth down and 8. For the first time in the entire postseason, the Colts were forced to punt on their next drive. Apparently, they were very out of practice, because the snap from center Justin Snow sailed over the head of punter Hunter Smith. The ball went into the end zone, and Smith was forced to knock it out of bounds for a safety, making the score 15–0.

The Colts had a great opportunity to score when rookie defense back David Macklin recovered a fumble from receiver Bethel Johnson three plays after the free kick, giving Indianapolis a first down on the Patriots 41-yard line. But five plays later, Harrison forced a fumble while tackling Marvin Harrison, and cornerback Tyrone Poole recovered it.

Trailing 15–0 at halftime, the Colts finally managed to build some momentum in the third quarter. First, Dominic Rhodes gave them great field position by returning the second half kickoff 35 yards to the 49-yard line. Then running back Edgerrin James spearheaded a 52-yard scoring drive, carrying the ball on 7 of 12 plays for 32 yards and capping it off with a 2-yard touchdown run to cut the score to 15–7. But the Patriots took over the rest of the period. After Patrick Pass returned the ensuing kickoff 21 yards to the 43-yard line, Brady completed passes to Larry Centers for 28 yards, Brown for 17, and Kevin Faulk for 8, setting up Vinatieri's third field goal to increase their lead to 18–7. Three plays after the ensuing kickoff, Indianapolis was forced to punt. Antowain Smith then rushed four times for 53 yards on New England's next possession, advancing the ball to the Colts 3-yard line where Vinatieri kicked his fourth field goal. Two plays after the ensuing kickoff, Law recorded his second interception from Manning on the Colts 31-yard line. But this time, the Patriots failed to score because defensive back Walt Harris picked off a pass from Brady in the end zone.

After the turnover, the Colts drove 57 yards to the New England 31-yard line. But then Manning threw his third interception to Law with 8:17 left in the fourth quarter. After forcing a punt, Manning led the Colts back, completing 8 of 9 passes for 64 yards and finishing the drive with a 7-yard touchdown pass to Marcus Pollard with 2:22 left in regulation. The Colts failed to recover their ensuing onside kick attempt, but forced a punt with 2:01 left. However, the Patriots defense limited Manning to four consecutive incompletions, causing the Colts to turn the ball over on downs. Then after making Indianapolis use up all of their timeouts, Vinatieri's 5th field goal increased the Patriots lead to 24–14. The Colts attempted one last desperation drive, but ended up turning the ball over on downs again with 7 seconds left in the game. The Patriots would go on to win 24-14 and advance to their second Super Bowl in three years.

Brady completed 22 of 37 passes for 237 yards and a touchdown, with 1 interception. Smith rushed for 100 yards. Pollard caught 6 passes for 90 yards and a touchdown. Rhodes returned five kickoffs for 121 yards, rushed for 16, and caught 2 passes for 17.

Colts players would later publicly complain that the game officials did not properly call illegal contact, pass interference, and defensive holding penalties on the Patriots' defensive backs. This, and similar complaints made by others, would prompt the NFL during the 2004 offseason to instruct all of the league's officials to strictly enforce these types of fouls.

Super Bowl XXXVIII vs. Carolina Panthers

Most of the first half was a defensive struggle, with neither team able to score until late in the second quarter, despite several early scoring opportunities for New England. After Carolina was forced to punt on their opening drive, Patriots receiver Troy Brown gave his team great field position with a 28-yard return to the Panthers 47-yard line. The Patriots subsequently marched to the 9-yard line, but Carolina kept them out of the end zone and Adam Vinatieri missed a 31-yard field goal attempt. The Patriots forced Carolina to punt after 3 plays and again got the ball with great field position, receiving Todd Sauerbrun's 40-yard punt at the Panthers 49-yard line. New England then drove to the 31-yard line, but on third down, linebacker Will Witherspoon tackled Brown for a 10-yard loss on an end-around play, pushing the Patriots out of field goal range. Later on, New England drove 57 yards to the Panthers 18-yard line with 6 minutes left in the second period, but once again they failed to score as Carolina kept them out of the end zone and Vinatieri's 36-yard field goal attempt was blocked by Panthers defender Shane Burton.

Meanwhile, the Panthers offense was stymied by the Patriot defense, with quarterback Jake Delhomme completing just one out of his first nine passes, sacked three times, and fumbling once. That fumble occurred 3 plays after Vinatieri's second missed field goal; Delhomme lost the ball while being sacked by linebacker Mike Vrabel, and Patriots defensive tackle Richard Seymour recovered the ball at the Panthers 20-yard line. Two plays later, New England faced a third down and 7, but quarterback Tom Brady scrambled 12 yards to the 5-yard line for a first down. Then wide receiver Deion Branch caught a 5-yard touchdown pass from Brady on the next play.

Branch's touchdown came after 26:55 had elapsed in the game, setting the record for the longest amount of time a Super Bowl remained scoreless. The play also suddenly set off a scoring explosion from both teams for the remainder of the first half.

The Panthers stormed down the field on their ensuing possession, driving 95 yards in 8 plays, and tying the game on a 39-yard touchdown pass from Delhomme to wide receiver Steve Smith with just 1:07 left in the half.

The Patriots immediately countered with a 6-play, 78-yard scoring drive of their own. Starting from their own 22-yard line, Brady completed a 12-yard pass to wide receiver David Givens. Then after throwing an incompletion, Brady completed a long pass to Branch, who caught it at the Panthers 24-yard line in stride before being tackled at the 14-yard line for a 52-yard gain. Three plays later, Givens caught a 5-yard touchdown from Brady to give New England a 14–7 lead with only 18 seconds left in the half. The Patriots decided to squib kick the ensuing kickoff to prevent a long return, but their plan backfired as Carolina tight end Kris Mangum picked up the ball at his own 35-yard line and returned it 12 yards to the 47. Panthers running back Stephen Davis then ran for 21 yards on the next play to set up kicker John Kasay's 50-yard field goal as time expired in the half, cutting Carolina's deficit to 14–10.

The third quarter was scoreless as each team exchanged punts twice. But with 3:57 left in the period, the Patriots put together a 71-yard, 8-play scoring drive, featuring tight end Daniel Graham's 33-yard reception to advance to the Carolina 9-yard line. Running back Antowain Smith then capped off the drive with a 2-yard touchdown run on the second play on the final period to increase their lead, 21–10. This was the start of another scoring explosion, one that became one of the biggest explosions in Super Bowl history, with both teams scoring a combined 37 points in the last 15 minutes, the most ever in a single quarter of a Super Bowl.

Delhomme started out Carolina's ensuing drive with a 13-yard completion to wide receiver Muhsin Muhammad. After committing a false start penalty on the next play, Delhomme completed a pair of passes to Smith for gains of 18 and 22 yards. Running back DeShaun Foster then scored on a 33-yard touchdown run, cutting the Panthers' deficit to 21–16 after Delhomme's 2-point conversion pass fell incomplete. The Patriots responded on their ensuing possession by driving all the way to Carolina's 9-yard line, but the drive ended when Panthers defensive back Reggie Howard intercepted a third down pass from Brady in the end zone. Then on 3rd down from his own 15-yard line, Delhomme threw for the longest play from scrimmage in Super Bowl history, an 85-yard touchdown completion to Muhammad. Carolina's 2-point conversion attempt failed again, but they took their first lead of the game, 22–21, with 6:53 remaining.

However, New England retook the lead on their next drive, advancing 68 yards with the aid of a pair of completions from Brady to Givens for gains of 18 and 25 yards. Once again the Patriots were faced with third down and goal, but this time they scored with Brady's 1-yard pass to Vrabel, who had lined up in an eligible tight end position. Then on a two-point conversion attempt, running back Kevin Faulk took a direct snap and ran into the end zone to make the score 29–22. Despite amassing over 1,000 combined yards, Kevin Faulk's two-point conversion constituted the only points he scored all season.

The Panthers countered on their next possession. Foster started the drive with a 9-yard run and a 7-yard reception. After that, Delhomme completed a 19-yard pass to Muhammad, followed by a 31-yard completion to receiver Ricky Proehl. Then Proehl, who caught the fourth quarter game-tying touchdown pass against the Patriots in Super Bowl XXXVI 2 years earlier for the St. Louis Rams, finished the drive with a 12-yard touchdown reception. Kasay's ensuing extra point tied the game, 29–29, with 1:08 to play in regulation and it appeared that the game would be the first Super Bowl ever to go into overtime.

However, Kasay kicked the ensuing kickoff out of bounds, giving New England the ball on their own 40-yard line. Brady calmly led the Patriots offense down the field with a 13-yard pass to Brown on second down. An offensive pass interference penalty on Brown pushed New England back to their own 43-yard line, but another 13-yard reception to Brown and a 4-yard pass to Graham brought up a critical 3rd down and 3 from the Carolina 40-yard line. The Panthers defense could not prevent the Patriots from gaining the first down, as Brady completed a clutch 17-yard pass to Branch. On the next play, Vinatieri kicked a 41-yard field goal to give New England the lead, 32–29, with four seconds left in the game. Carolina failed on their last chance, as Rod Smart went nowhere on the resulting kickoff, and the Patriots had won their second Super Bowl in three years. This was the fourth Super Bowl to be decided on a field goal in the final seconds. Super Bowl V was won on a last second kick by Jim O'Brien, Super Bowl XXV as Scott Norwood missed his field goal chance, and Super Bowl XXXVI as Adam Vinatieri made his.

Awards and honors

Pro Bowl selections
Three Patriots were elected to the 2004 Pro Bowl. Cornerback Ty Law and defensive lineman Richard Seymour were both named as starters, while linebacker Willie McGinest was named as a reserve, replacing the injured Peter Boulware.

Notes and references

External links
Season page on Pro Football Reference

New England Patriots
New England Patriots seasons
AFC East championship seasons
American Football Conference championship seasons
Super Bowl champion seasons
New England Patriots
Sports competitions in Foxborough, Massachusetts